Andriy Protsko (born 14 October 1947) is a former professional Soviet football forward and coach.

Career
He started his career for FC Desna Chernihiv in 1966– until 1970. In 1971 he moved to FC Dynamo Khmelnytskyi until 1972. The following year he moved to FC Khimik Chernihiv, where he won Ukrainian Amateur Football Championship in 1976, the Chernihiv Oblast Football Championship in 1973, 1975, 1976. He also won the Chernihiv Oblast Football Cup 1975. FC Kolos Poltava, FC Khimik Chernihiv. In 1977 he returned to FC Desna Chernihiv until 1980.

Honours

As Player 
Khimik Chernihiv
 Ukrainian Amateur Football Championship: 1976
 Chernihiv Oblast Football Championship 1973, 1975, 1976
Chernihiv Oblast Football Cup 1975

Desna Chernihiv
 Football Championship of the Ukrainian SSR: 1968

References

External links
 
 Andriy Protsko: "For me there always was main principle, to stay in football" (Андрій Процко: «Для мене завжди було головне – залишатися у футболі»). Svoboda FM. 28 September 2017

1947 births
Living people
Footballers from Chernihiv
Soviet footballers
Ukrainian footballers
SDYuShOR Desna players
FC Desna Chernihiv players
FC Vorskla Poltava players
FC Podillya Khmelnytskyi players
Soviet football managers
Ukrainian football managers
FC Desna Chernihiv managers
FC Khimik Chernihiv players
FC Spartak Chernihiv players
Association football forwards